The Camden News was a weekly newspaper published in Camden, New South Wales, Australia from 1881 to 1982.

History
The Camden News was first published in 1881 by William Sidman and Frank Campbell. The publication of the Camden News ceased with the 2 June 1982 issue.

Digitisation
The paper has been digitised as part of the Australian Newspapers Digitisation Program project of the National Library of Australia.

See also
 List of newspapers in Australia
 List of newspapers in New South Wales

References

External links
 

Defunct newspapers published in New South Wales